Shahrak-e Shahid Rajai (also Romanized as Shahrak-e Shahīd Rajāī) is a village in Forg Rural District, Forg District, Darab County, Fars Province, Iran. At the 2006 census, its population was 332, in 66 families.

References 

Populated places in Darab County